Crabtree may refer to:

People
 Crabtree (surname)

Places
 Crabtree, California
 Crabtree, North Carolina, an unincorporated community in Haywood County, United States
 Crabtree, Oregon
 Crabtree, Pennsylvania
 Crabtree, Plymouth, a suburb of Plymouth in the county of Devon, England
 Crabtree, Quebec, Canada
 Crabtree, Tasmania, Australia
 Crabtree, West Sussex, a hamlet in the parish of Lower Beeding and in Horsham District in England
 Crabtree Creek (disambiguation)
 Crabtree Falls, Virginia
 Crabtree Falls (North Carolina),  a waterfall in Yancey County, United States
 Crabtree Hot Springs, California, a closed, private hot springs in Lake County, United States
 Crabtree Ledge Light, a sparkplug lighthouse on Frenchman Bay, Maine, United States
 Crabtree Valley Mall, North Carolina
 John A. Crabtree House, a house located in Montgomery in Orange County, New York, United States
 Lake Crabtree, a reservoir in Cary, North Carolina, United States
 Lake Crabtree County Park, a park in Wake County, North Carolina, United States
 Mount Crabtree, a mountain in Marie Byrd Land, West Antarctica
 Thomas Crabtree Three-Decker, a historic house in Worcester, Massachusetts, United States

Companies
 Crabtree & Evelyn, an American retailer of body and home products
 Crabtree Brewing Co., a regional brewery located in Greeley, Colorado, United States
 Crabtree Modular Switches, a company now merged in the Indian electrical equipment Havells

Science
 Crabtree's catalyst, a complex of iridium with 1,5-cyclooctadiene, tris-cyclohexylphosphine and pyridine
 Crabtree effect, a phenomenon whereby the yeast, Saccharomyces cerevisiae, produces ethanol  aerobically in the presence of high external glucose concentrations rather than producing biomass via the tricarboxylic acid cycle

Plants
 The crabapple tree

Asteroids
 4137 Crabtree, a main-belt asteroid discovered in 1970